Ummidia picea is a spider species found in Spain.

References

External links 

Halonoproctidae
Spiders of Europe
Spiders described in 1875